Procastoroides is an extinct genus of beaver-grouped rodents.

References

 McKenna, Malcolm C., and Bell, Susan K. 1997. Classification of Mammals Above the Species Level. Columbia University Press, New York, 631 pp. 

Prehistoric beavers
Prehistoric rodent genera